Le Portalet is a mountain of the Mont Blanc massif, located west of Praz de Fort in the canton of Valais. It lies on the range between the glaciers of Trient and Saleina. It has two important subsidiary summits: Grand Clocher du Portalet (2,983 m) and Petit Clocher du Portalet (2,823 m). The latter forms a needle and is particularly hard to climb.

References

External links
Le Portalet on Hikr
Portalet - Petit Clocher du Portalet on Summitpost

Mountains of the Alps
Alpine three-thousanders
Mountains of Valais
Mountains of Switzerland
Mont Blanc massif